Trujillo Province was a province in the Zulia Department of Gran Colombia.

Cantons
 Trujillo Canton - Trujillo
 Boconó Canton - Boconó
 Escuque Canton - Escuque
 Carache Canton - Carache

Provinces of Gran Colombia